Basic Education High School (BEHS) No. 6 Botataung (abbreviated to ; commonly known as Botataung 6 High School or St. Paul's High School), located a few miles east of downtown Yangon in Botataung township, is a public high school, and one of the oldest high schools in Myanmar. The school initially offered three kindergarten classes - Lower, Middle, Higher known as LKG, MKG, HKG and First through Tenth Standard. It now offers classes from kindergarten to Tenth Standard (or Grade 1 through Grade 11 in the new nomenclature).

Known during the British colonial days as St. Paul's English High School, the Roman Catholic parochial school was the top school of choice for the children of the elite. Many of the country's who's who in those days were alumni of St. Paul's. The school was nationalized in 1965. While it is no longer the leading high school it once was, the school continues to be among the better (certainly among the better known) high schools in Yangon, serving mostly the children of middle-class families from downtown Yangon and vicinity.

The school's main three-story red brick colonial era building is a landmark protected by the city, and is listed on the Yangon City Heritage List.

History

The school was founded as St. Paul's English High School by the De La Salle Brothers, a Roman Catholic order in August 1860, eight years after the British had annexed Yangon and all of Lower Myanmar. It was the second La Sallian high school in the country. (St. Patrick's High School in Mawlamyine was the first La Sallian high school and founded in April 1860.) The initial school was a wooden building on Barr Street (now Maha Bandula Park Street) and moved to its present site in 1886. Between 1900 and 1908, two new Thomas Swales-designed wings were added. Later in the 1930s, a study hall and refectory were extended.

The all-boys school was among the few early schools that educated the children of the country's British officers, the Anglo-Burmese, the Anglo-Indians and the wealthy Burmese. Naturally, many of the notable colonial era names were St. Paul's alumni. The language of instruction was mainly English in the early days, and bi-lingual for some classes in the later days. Latin, science and higher mathematics were taught in the senior classes. Special interest classes such as Painting, and Carpentry and Woodcarving were also offered. The highlights of the school year were the annual sports and school concerts.

In April 1965, when Gen. Ne Win's military government nationalized private schools, the school was renamed to "Basic Education High School (BEHS) No. 6 Botataung". The primary language of instruction became Burmese. The school, which used to have a "Roll of Honor" for its outstanding students, steadily lost significance partly due to the new requirement to attend nearby schools as much as possible. Nevertheless, the school is still considered among the top high schools in Myanmar. Many well-to-do and wealthy families prefer to send their children to TTC and Dagon 1 High School. The elite do not hesitate to send their kids to English language private schools that cost US$8000 or more annually. Today, Botataung 6 attracts mostly the children of middle-class families from downtown Yangon.

The school has produced two top-ranked students, who finished first in the country's highly competitive University Entrance Examinations, one in 1974 and another in 1984.

Campus

Botataung 6 is one of the few high schools in Myanmar with a sizable campus, covering perhaps 75% of the entire city square block. The compound of St. Mary's Cathedral, north of the school, takes up the other 25% of the block. The school is bounded by Theinbyu Road to the east, Anawrahta Road to the south and Aung Kyaw Road to the west. The former Secretariat Compound, where Gen. Aung San was assassinated, is located across Anawrahta Road. The all-girls Botataung 4 High School (formerly, St. Mary's Convent School) and co-ed Botataung 5 High School are located in the vicinity of the school.

The gated campus consists of some of the best facilities available in Myanmar:
 Landmark U-shaped three-story main building—East and West wings house ten classrooms each, labeled A through J; also a Physics laboratory and a Chemistry laboratory
 Aung Kyaw Hall, two-story annex building; houses school's main auditorium and school library
 Aung San Hall, two-story annex building
 Regulation size football pitch
 Smaller practice football pitch; also used as an outdoor volleyball court
 One indoor basketball/volleyball court
 Two tennis courts; also double as basketball courts
 Cafeteria

Programs
The school offers classes from K through 10 in two daily shifts. (The Burmese education system is based on the colonial 11-year secondary school curriculum although most other countries are on a 13-year curriculum.) The early shift handles K through 4 and the second shift does 5 through 10. Due to the use of two shifts and the availability of a large number of classrooms, the class size at Botataung 6 is around 40 to 50, much lower than 70-80 students in a typical Burmese classroom.

The school which produced notable scholars in the past has succumbed to the provant teaching style based mainly on memorization and rote learning. Due to severe lack of funding, the school's library and labs are rarely used. Teachers teach for and students study for the exams. Most students attend specialized private classes (locally called tuition classes) on specific subject matters. In a world where teachers must supplement their abysmally low salaries, many of the private classes are given by the teachers (ignoring the conflict of interest) with the primary focus on exam-specific topics.

Cost
Although the schools are nominally free in Myanmar, in reality, parents still have to pay for school maintenance, donations and registration fees as well as books and uniforms. The overall costs quickly become considerable, even for middle-class parents when the cost for evening tuition classes are factored in.

Alumni

Academia and medicine

Business

Literature and arts

Music and cinema

Politics and government

Sports
Nanda Kyaw Swa                    Swimming

List of headmasters
The following is a list of headmasters since nationalization in 1965.

 Thant Gyi (1965)
 Captain Ba Hein (1965–69)
 Myat Htun (1969–79)
 Tun Aung (1980–81)
 Thein Kyi (1981)
 Tin Tun (1981–83)
 Min Maung (1983–90)
 Kyaw Myint (1990–95)
 Win Naing (1995–96)
 Kyi Than (1996–2003)
 Khin Maung Soe (2003–05)
 Maung Lone (2005–07)
 Dr. Win Min Latt (2007–10)
 Dr. Kyaw Soe Naing (2010–12)
 Thein Win (2012–13)
 Kyaw Kyaw Tun (2014–18)
 Swe Swe Hlaing (2018 - present)

References

High schools in Yangon